Sagaing Region Government is the cabinet of Sagaing Region. The cabinet is led by chief minister, Myint Naing.

Cabinet (2016-)

References 

State and region governments of Myanmar
Sagaing Region